Firefighter exposure tracking software is software that manages the exposures that firefighters are going to face in the line of duty. These typically include: smoke and fume inhalation, chemical splash or ingestion, body fluids, pathogens, poisons and toxins, venom, radiation. Using such as this ensures that legal teams have a solid base to work from should litigation be necessary.

Firefighting equipment